Patrick Chesnais (born 18 March 1947) is a French actor, film director and screenwriter.

Life and career 
Patrick Chesnais was born in La Garenne-Colombes, Hauts-de-Seine. He was educated at the Lycée Pierre Corneille in Rouen.

In 1989, he won the César Award for Best Actor in a Supporting Role for his performance in the film La Lectrice directed by Michel Deville. In 1994, he starred in Harold Pinter's Le Retour, and in 1992, in La Belle Histoire by Claude Lelouch.

He starred in Hany Tamba's Melodrama Habibi in 2008.

He is married to fellow actor Josiane Stoléru.

Theater

Filmography

Decorations 
 Commander of the Order of Arts and Letters (2015)

References

External links

Artmedia

1947 births
Living people
People from La Garenne-Colombes
Lycée Pierre-Corneille alumni
French male film actors
French film directors
French male screenwriters
French screenwriters
French male television actors
French male stage actors
20th-century French male actors
21st-century French male actors
Best Supporting Actor César Award winners
Commandeurs of the Ordre des Arts et des Lettres